Eduardo Gelli (1853 in Savona – 1933) was an Italian painter, mainly of genre costume  portraits.

Biography
He trained in Florence under Antonio Ciseri. The contemporary American art collector James Jackson Jarves grouped him in with Francesco Vinea and Tito Conti, two other costume genre painters. At the Louisiana Purchase Exposition of 1904, he displayed The Lost Chord.

References

1853 births
1933 deaths
Italian costume genre painters
19th-century Italian painters
Italian male painters
20th-century Italian painters
Painters from Florence
19th-century Italian male artists
20th-century Italian male artists